Graham Sidney "Willie" Watson (born 31 August 1949) is an English former footballer who played in the Football League for Cambridge United, Doncaster Rovers, Lincoln City,  and Rotherham United.

References

External links
 

English footballers
English Football League players
Lincoln City F.C. players
Rotherham United F.C. players
Cambridge United F.C. players
Doncaster Rovers F.C. players
1949 births
Living people
Association football midfielders